Elms (Ulmus species) are used as food plants by the larvae of a number of Lepidoptera species including:

Monophagous
Species that feed exclusively on Ulmus

 Bucculatricidae
 Bucculatrix albedinella
 Bucculatrix eclecta
 Bucculatrix ulmifoliae
 Coleophoridae
 Coleophora ulmifoliella
 Gelechiidae
 Carpatolechia fugitivella
 Geometridae
 Blomer's rivulet (Venusia blomeri)
 Clouded magpie (Abraxas sylvata)
 Gracillariidae
 Phyllonorycter schreberella
 Phyllonorycter tristrigella
 Lycaenidae
 White-letter hairstreak (Satyrium w-album)
 Lymantriidae
 Black V moth (Arctornis l-nigrum)
 Nepticulidae
 Stigmella lemniscella
 Stigmella viscerella
 Noctuidae
 Dusky lemon sallow (Xanthia gilvago)
 Lesser spotted pinion (Cosmia affinis)
 White-spotted pinion moth (Cosmia diffinis)
 Pyralidae
 Rhodophaea formosa
 Tortricidae
 Acleris kochiella

Polyphagous
Species that feed on Ulmus among other plants

 Bucculatricidae
 Bucculatrix ulmella
 Coleophoridae
 Several Coleophora case-bearer species:
Coleophora badiipennella
Coleophora cerasivorella
Coleophora comptoniella
Coleophora fuscedinella
Coleophora limosipennella
Coleophora serratella
 Erebidae
 Banded tussock moth; pale tiger moth (Halysidota tessellaris)
 Geometridae
 Autumnal moth (Epirrita autumnata)
 Dotted border (Agriopis marginaria)
 Engrailed (Ectropis crepuscularia)
 Feathered thorn (Colotois pennaria)
 Light emerald (Campaea margaritata)
 Mottled umber (Erannis defoliaria)
 November moth (Epirrita dilutata)
 Pale November moth (Epirrita christyi)
 Scarce umber (Agriopis aurantiaria)
 Winter moth (Operophtera brumata)
 Lasiocampidae
 Lackey (Malacosoma neustria)
 Lymantriidae
 Brown-tail (Euproctis chrysorrhoea)
 Vapourer (Orgyia antiqua)
 Noctuidae
 The Brick (Agrochola circellaris)
 Common Quaker (Orthosia cerasi)
 The dun-bar (Cosmia trapezina)
 Grey dagger (Acronicta psi)
 Lesser broad-bordered yellow underwing (Noctua janthina)
 Lunar spotted pinion (Cosmia pyralina)
 The nutmeg (Discestra trifolii)
 The satellite (Eupsilia transversa)
 Twin-spotted Quaker (Perigrapha munda)
 Notodontidae
 Buff-tip (Phalera bucephala)
 Coxcomb prominent (Ptilodon capucina)
 Nymphalidae
 Comma (Polygonia c-album)
 Eastern comma (Polygonia comma)
 Large tortoiseshell (Nymphalis polychloros)
 Mourning cloak; Camberwell beauty (Nymphalis antiopa)
 Painted lady (Vanessa cardui)
 Question mark (Polygonia interrogationis)
 Red-spotted purple (Limenitis arthemis astyanax)
 Scarce tortoiseshell or yellow-legged tortoiseshell (Nymphalis xanthomelas)
 Saturniidae
 Columbian silkmoth (Hyalophora columbia)
 Emperor moth (Pavonia pavonia)
 Sphingidae
 Elm sphinx (Ceratomia amyntor)
 Lime hawk-moth (Mimas tiliae)
 Poplar hawk-moth (Laothoe populi)
 Twin-spotted sphinx (Smerinthus jamaicensis)
 Tortricidae
 Epinotia abbreviana

References

External links

Elms
+Lepidoptera